HALO Urban Regeneration (Scottish Gaelic: HALO Ath-nuadhachadh Bailteil), known simply as The HALO, is a Scottish business innovation park, urban regeneration and business start-up support company, founded, based and headquartered in Kilmarnock, East Ayrshire, Scotland. The HALO Urban Regeneration was founded by entrepreneur Marie Macklin CBE in 2006 as HALO Urban Regeneration Company Ltd., having announced the project a few years prior to official funding and creation of the HALO Kilmarnock.

HALO is projected to generate £205 million to the Economy of Scotland and stimulate 1,500 jobs.

History

HALO Scotland
Following the 2009 announcement of the closure of the Johnnie Walker whisky bottling unit and production factory in Kilmarnock, owners Diageo began seeking proposals for future leasing of the Hill Street site that occupied that 32-acre site at that time. Diageo gifted eight acres to Kilmarnock College (a campus of Ayrshire College since 2013) in 2012 to allow the construction of a new multi-million pound campus to replace the ageing building that was constructed during the 1960s. Marie Macklin CBE, Chief Executive of The KLIN Group at the time, who had already undertaken numerous projects in and around Kilmarnock to restore derelict buildings in the town centre, submitted a proposal for a new, innovative hub to provide office space for startup companies and opportunities to enhance Kilmarnock's urban regeneration work.

A planning application for permission for construction work on the new project was submitted to the planning advisory board of East Ayrshire Council, was planning permission granted by the council in 2018. The cost of the development was estimated to be £65 million, with the Scottish Government announcing a £5.3 million investment in the HALO Project in August 2017, with £1.8 million to be focused on low carbon emissions which was ultimately unused.

Morrison Construction was appointed as main contractors for the construction of the complex in September 2019, with construction work initially scheduled to be completed by January 2021, however this was delayed as a result of the halt on construction works in Scotland due to the COVID-19 pandemic and phase one opened March 2022 

The HALO Urban Regeneration benefitted as part of the Ayrshire Growth Deal, an economic recovery agreement between the Scottish Government, UK Government and the councils of East Ayrshire, North Ayrshire and South Ayrshire, with the Scottish Government and UK Government both providing £3.5 million of investment for the company and the regeneration of the former Johnnie Walker site. Diageo who owned the land when occupied by the former Johnnie Walker bottling and production plant facility donated the land for a cost of £1 and under the Ayrshire Growth Deal has been committed to a contribution of £2 million to support planning and design of the HALO development as well as long-term sustainability of the Hill Street site as a consequence for closing the Johnnie Walker facility.

HALO Northern Ireland
 
A second HALO project is scheduled to begin planning and construction in Northern Ireland.

Upcoming expansion

The HALO is scheduled to begin planning and construction of new premises to focus on urban regeneration projects in both Wales and England. The timescale for completion on these projects in England, Wales and Northern Ireland have still to be announced.

Services

Key services

The Halo Urban Regeneration is founded with a particular focus on:

 Urban regeneration of Kilmarnock and Ayrshire
 Providing business and financial support for small startup businesses 
 Office space for companies 
 Residential houses
 Live Work Studios (#RockMe)
 Education and employment programmes 
 Urban Park, including entrepreneurial businesses from computer technology, cyber research, engineering, fashion, financial services and light manufacturing 
 A Fashion Foundry for small businesses designing, producing and retailing fashionwear and providing training skills for the new digital age will complement the digital retail boutique shopping arcade.
 A Children's Innovation Centre will engage with young people of all ages, from eco-nursery through to higher education, working in partnership with local schools, colleges and universities.
 Leisure and community amenities will include a WAVE Surf water feature built to Olympic training standards, as well as a skateboard park and other activity areas for all ages.

Business intentions

The HALO Urban Regeneration has a particular focus on, and intention to:

 Provide flexible, affordable workspace in an inspiring environment for entrepreneurs with spin-out, start-up and step-up businesses.
 Produce an informed and skilled supply of employment-ready young people to sharpen the technical and commercial competitive edges of businesses, especially in the retail and business service sectors.
 Create and sustain leading-edge learning facilities and opportunities to support widening access and inclusive growth for all communities, but particularly raising aspirations of children and young adults.

Business partnerships

The HALO Urban Regeneration has established business partnerships with various companies and organisations to support the business in its key business strategy. Most notably, HALO Urban Regeneration focuses on education and youth employment opportunities and includes partners such as:

 East Ayrshire Council
 The Scottish Government
 The UK Government
 Diageo
 Scottish Power
 CGI
 Onecom 
 Scottish Business Resilience Centre
 Barclays

A business partnership in association with Scottish Power makes the energy company the main HALO Platinum Partner and Sponsor. Scottish Power launched a £5 million, five-year programme, with a focus on building and enhancing the companies focus and vision of “Utility of the Future” vision. The Halo Urban Regeneration claim that the company will be a leader in the HALO Innovation and Enterprise Centre and the Digital and Cyber Zone. HALO and Scottish Power have committed to working together to create a cyber and digital training and learning facility, at the forefront of the ‘Fourth Industrial Revolution’.

The HALO Urban Regeneration developed a partnership with Barclays in order to enhance HALO's employability initiatives for individuals in Ayrshire, seeks to eradicate barriers those facing unemployment of any age many experience, through Barclays LifeSkills, allowing individuals to access education and digital technology. Additionally, the Barclays-HALO partnership seeks to help start-up and scale-up entrepreneurial businesses to capitalise on growth opportunities, as well as enhancing connectivity and collaboration with other businesses locally and across the UK. In 2019, Barclays launched their first Thriving Local Economies initiative in Kilmarnock as a result of their partnership with The Halo Urban Regeneration, with a particular focus on strategies to boost and enhance the economy of Kilmarnock.

Economic performance

The HALO Urban Regeneration company aims to create and sustain over 1,500 jobs within Kilmarnock as well as a projected contribution of £205 million in Gross Domestic Product revenue to the Economy of Scotland.

Ayrshire College

As part of the sale of the 32-acre site by Diageo, Ayrshire College was granted part of the site which neighbours the HQ and office space of The Halo Urban Regeneration. Due to the close proximity and sharing the site, the company has formed an ambitious partnership with Ayrshire College to ensure the integration of the college with The HALO Urban Regeneration to progress a deep range of practical learning experiences for students, as well as developing new qualifications for Ayrshire College students, ranging from qualifications within the construction section, digital skills market, as well as social care and design.

The HALO Urban Regeneration seeks to create a skilled workforce within Kilmarnock and Ayrshire as a result of its educational and business partnership with Ayrshire College.

In 2020, an NPA qualification was founded in collaboration with The HALO Urban Regeneration, Ayrshire College and construction contractors Morrisons Construction, with students able to access work placements on site during the construction process site.

Board of management 
Marie Macklin CBE, founder and executive chair
The current board composition of the HALO Urban Regeneration consists of:
 Dr. Marie Macklin CBE, Founder and executive chair
 Derek Weir, Managing director
 Drew Macklin, Project director
 Gary Deans, Financial and enterprise director
 Bill Stafford, non-executive director 
 Jim McMahon, non-executive director

See also

 Kilmarnock
 East Ayrshire
 Johnnie Walker, the site on which the HALO Urban Regeneration has been constructed 
 Economy of Scotland
 Kilmarnock College
 Ayrshire College

References

Buildings and structures in Kilmarnock
Companies of Scotland
Organisations based in East Ayrshire
2015 establishments in Scotland
Economy of Scotland
Business organisations based in Scotland
Urban renewal
Redevelopment
Government aid programs
Entrepreneurship organizations
Buildings and structures completed in 2021